Södra Vrams fälad was a locality situated in Bjuv Municipality, Skåne County, Sweden with 249 inhabitants in 2010. By 2015 it has merged with Bjuv and lost its status as a separate locality.

References 

Populated places in Skåne County
Populated places in Bjuv Municipality